South Carolina Highway 6 (SC 6) is a  primary state highway in the U.S. state of South Carolina. It extends from US 76 in Ballentine to US 52/SC 6 Truck in Moncks Corner. It uniquely links all three of the major hydropower projects in South Carolina: Lake Murray, Lake Marion, and Lake Moultrie.

Route description
The highway runs generally southeast from the central part of South Carolina to near the Atlantic Ocean and is listed as a hurricane evacuation route.

Beginning at a junction with U.S. Highway 52 in Moncks Corner, the route runs northwest along the shoreline of Lake Moultrie as West Main Street. It then turns right onto Ranger Drive. It turns left onto "Old Number Six Highway" where is later starts a concurrency with SC 45 as Eutaw Road. The concurrency runs and far from Lake Marion, and passes through Eutawville. There SC 45 departs to the west and SC 6 continues along the lake through Vance to Santee, where it  intersects Interstate 95. It then adjoins the Santee State Park on its right. After a concurrency with SC 267 begins, it becomes Main Street through Elloree, South Carolina. The concurrency ends when SC 267 turns off to the right onto Lonestar Road.  SC 6 then traverses St. Matthews as Bridge Street before having a brief concurrency with U.S. Highway 176. Route 26 turns left onto Caw Caw Highway and has an interchange with Interstate 26. The route turns right and head northwest in a concurrency with U.S. Route 21  and then separates from U.S. 21 onto Center Hill Road.  It turns right on St. Matthews Road in a northwesterly direction, passing through Swansea as 2nd Street intersecting U.S. Route 321 in town and joining a concurrency with SC 302 as Edmund Hwy. The concurrency ends when SC 6 turns to the left onto S. Lake Drive where it heads northwest to Red Bank.  In Red Bank, it intersects with Interstate 20.

The route then passes through Lexington where it briefly separates into a one-way street pair. It crosses U.S. Route 1 and has a brief concurrency with U.S. Route 378. SC 6 passes just east of Lake Murray (over the Saluda Dam as a divided highway). In Irmo, SC 6 changes from N. Lake Drive to Dreher Shoals Road before ending at a junction with U.S. Highway 76 in Ballentine. The last section of the route runs south and west of Columbia, the state capital. Counties traversed by the route include Berkeley, Orangeburg, Calhoun, Lexington, and Richland.

Major intersections

Special routes

Irmo connector route

South Carolina Highway 6 Connector (SC 6 Conn.) is a  connector route that exists southwest of Irmo. It is actually a ramp southwest of the intersection of SC 6, SC 60, and Bush River Road. It is unnamed and is an unsigned highway.

Elloree truck route

South Carolina Highway 6 Truck (SC 6 Truck) is a  truck route of SC 6 that has about half of its path within the city limits of Elloree. It begins at an intersection with SC 47 on Felderville Road (S-38-81). It travels to the southeast. Then, it turns left onto Snider Street (S-38-1023) and travels to the northeast.; at Main Street, it intersects SC 6/SC 267 (Old Number Six Highway). Here, it reaches its eastern terminus. It is entirely concurrency with SC 47 Truck. A Food Lion distribution center is located in the town, the truck route provides an alternate route to that center.

Santee connector route

South Carolina Highway 6 Connector (SC 6 Conn.) is a  connector route that exists southeast of Santee. It is a connector between Interstate 95, U.S. Route 15 (US 15), and US 301 south of the town and SC 6 southeast of it. It is named Five Chop Road and is an unsigned highway.

Moncks Corner truck route

South Carolina Highway 6 Truck (SC 6 Truck) is a  truck route in the central portion of Moncks Corner, which is in the central portion of Berkeley County. The entire length is concurrent with U.S. Route 17 Alternate (US 17 Alt.) and US 52.

The truck route begins at an intersection with the SC 6 mainline (Main Street). At this intersection, it begins concurrent with US 17 Alt. (South Live Oak Drive). The two highways travel to the northeast and curve to the east-northeast. They pass the Berkeley County Courthouse and the Berkeley County Sheriff's Office. An intersection with the northern terminus of Carolina Avenue leads to the historic downtown, city hall, and recreation complex of the city. They travel on a bridge over some railroad tracks of CSX and then pass Berkeley Middle School. After passing the Moncks Corner Medical Center, they intersect US 52. Here, SC 6 Truck turns right and follows US 52 to the south-southwest. The two highways travel along a retail corridor. Then, they intersect the eastern terminus of SC 6 (East Main Street) and the western terminus of Main Street Extension. Here, SC 6 Truck ends, and US 52 continues to the south-southwest.

See also

References
Rand McNally: The Road Atlas 2002, Rand McNally and Company 2001

External links

SC 6 at Virginia Highways' South Carolina Highways Annex
South Carolina Department of Transportation county road maps for Berkeley, Orangeburg, Calhoun, Lexington, and Richland (Adobe Acrobat reader required for maps; enlargement of maps necessary for legibility)
South Carolina Department of Transportation map of hurricane evacuation routes (Adobe Acrobat reader required for map)

006
Transportation in Richland County, South Carolina
Transportation in Lexington County
Transportation in Calhoun County, South Carolina
Transportation in Orangeburg County, South Carolina
Transportation in Berkeley County, South Carolina